Job de Roincé (Born Joseph Boreau de Roincé, 18 April 1896, Segré, Maine-et-Loire - 30 December 1981), was a French journalist and writer, and also one of the founding figures of Breton nationalism.

Biography 

Born in Segré in Maine-et-Loire in 1896, he attended school in Saint-Pol-de-Léon (Finistère). As a teenager, he participated in the birth of Bleun-Brug, the movement of abbot Jean-Marie Perrot. After the First World War, he helped to create the Group of Young Bretons in 1919 with other members of Action Française like Charles Maurras. This movement was the origin of the separatist faction Breiz Atao, which he joined, but quickly left, as their radical views were incompatible with his own conservatism. However he later joined the Breton National Party, advocating for a royalist position.

From a professional point of view, he started his career as a journalist with the journal Le Nouvelliste de Rennes. Between 1925 and 1945, he worked for Courrier de la Mayenne. From 1950, he lived in Rennes as the cartoon editor of Nouvelles de Bretagne. In all, he was an important literary activist, crucial in the regionalist politics and history of the west of France.

Publications

Cartoons 
 La belle histoire de la Duchesse en sabots. Bande dessinée. Series : Collection « À la française » n° 2. Cartoonist : Pierre Rousseau. Director : Job de Roincé. 1942
 La belle histoire de Jean Chouan. Bande dessinée. Series : Collection « À la française » n° 3. Cartoonist: Pierre Rousseau. Director: Job de Roincé. 1942
 La Belle histoire de Surcouf Artistic and literary edition - Paris. 1942. Coll. A la française n°5
 Jacques Cartier, le Christophe Colomb Breton. Artistic and literary edition - Paris. 1942. Coll. A la française n°6 
 Le mousse de la Bellecordière  Artistic and literary edition 1943. Coll.A la française
 Le mystère du château du Taureau. Ololé Edition - Landerneau. Breton cultural propaganda for youth edition : Urz Goanag Breiz. Containing : "La Peste et le laboureur ; Une Affaire grave ; Le Miracle de la ruche ; L'Ermite qui n'avait plus de feu ; Les Moines de Cuburien". 1943.
 Les pirates de l'île aux moines, tomes 1 et 2. Art: Claudel / Written: Job de Roincé. 1946, 1947.

Books 
 Jean Chouan
 Double victoire, (Novel), Mayenne. 1931.
 Un drame au large Pièce en 3 actes . La Voix de l'Ouest - Rennes. 1945.
 Au Pays de Léon, son histoire, ses légendes, ses pardons, Rennes, H. Riou-Reuzé, 1946. My Books Collection. 
 Ici Rennes, Rennes, Riou-Reuzé, 1948. History
 Les Heures glorieuses du 41e R.I. X 1965, Complete history of the Fourth Republic from its early days. Further chapters deal with the conquest of Algeria and the wars of 1914-1918 and 1939-1945. 
 Charleroi 1914, Rennes, Imprimerie Les Nouvelles, 1967
 Le Livre de l'Armistice : l'Allemagne à Genoux (Novembre 1918), Imprimerie Les Nouvelles, Rennes, 1968.
 La Cuisine rustique. Bretagne, Maine, Anjou,  Forcalquier, Morel, 1970. Collaboration with Yvonne Meynier.
 La Bretagne malade de la république, Rennes, imprimerie Les Nouvelles, 1971.
 Le colonel Armand, marquis de la Rouërie, Lanore, Paris, 1975.
 Le drame de Quiberon (1795). Imprimerie ' Les nouvelles ' à Rennes, 1976.
 Histoire de Chouans, Fernand Lanore, 1978.
 Mémorial des martyrs d'Avrillé. Rennes, Les nouvelles, 1979.
 Figures de Chouans, Fernand Lanore, Paris, 1980.

1896 births
1981 deaths
People from Maine-et-Loire
Breton National Party politicians
Writers from Brittany
French male non-fiction writers
Winners of the Prix Broquette-Gonin (literature)
20th-century French journalists
20th-century French male writers